Jack Cross (26 September 1908 – 17 December 1967) was an Australian rules footballer who played with Essendon in the Victorian Football League (VFL).

Notes

External links 
		

1908 births
1967 deaths
Australian rules footballers from Victoria (Australia)
Essendon Football Club players